Ibrahim Manik (born 19 March 1969) is a Maldivian sprinter. He competed in the men's 4 × 100 metres relay at the 1988 Summer Olympics.

References

External links
 

1969 births
Living people
Athletes (track and field) at the 1988 Summer Olympics
Maldivian male sprinters
Olympic athletes of the Maldives
Place of birth missing (living people)